Chaudhry Wajahat Hussain (born ) is a Pakistani politician who had been a member of the National Assembly of Pakistan from 2002 to 2013. In 2023, he was appointed as the president of PML-Q  after his brother Chaudhry Shujaat Hussain was removed from the position by a breakway faction. Later, Election commission of Pakistan reverted the decision and stated it an illegal move. Also given all powers back to Chaudhry Shujaat Hussain. He is current member of Pakistan Tehreek e Insaf. He is the father of the current member national assembly Chaudhry Hussain Elahi and uncle of Moonis Elahi and Chaudhry Salik Hussain.

Early life & Education
Chaudhry Wajahat Hussain, also known as "Commander Gujrat", son of Chaudhry Zahoor Elahi, was born in 1960 in Gujrat. He is a graduate of George Washington University in USA where he completed a bachelor's degree in Political Science. For his primary and high school, he attended the Aitchison College Lahore, where many Pakistani businessmen and politicians have attended.

Political career
He was elected to the National Assembly of Pakistan from Constituency NA-104 (Gujrat-I) as a candidate of Pakistan Muslim League (Q) (PML-Q) in 2002 Pakistani general election. He received 82,126 votes and defeated Nawabzada Ghazanfar Ali Gul. In the same election, he also ran for the seat of the National Assembly from Constituency NA-105 (Gujrat-II) as an independent candidate but was unsuccessful. He received 1,061 votes and lost the seat to Shujaat Hussain.

He was re-elected to the National Assembly from Constituency NA-104 (Gujrat-I) as a candidate of PML-Q in 2008 Pakistani general election. He received 96,379 votes and defeated Nawabzada Ghazanfar Ali Gul. On 3 May 2011, he was inducted into the federal cabinet of Prime Minister Yousaf Raza Gillani and was appointed as Federal Minister for Overseas Pakistanis where he served until 15 May 2011. On 16 May, he was made Federal Minister for Labour and Manpower where he served until 30 June 2011. From 1 July to 29 July, he remained in the federal cabinet with the status of a federal minister without any portfolio. On 30 July, he was appointed as Federal Minister for Human Resource Development where he continued to serve until June 2012. In June 2012, he was inducted into the federal cabinet of Prime Minister Raja Pervaiz Ashraf and was appointed as Federal Minister for Human Resource Development where he served until May 2013.

He ran for the seat of the National Assembly from Constituency NA-104 (Gujrat-I) as a candidate of PML-Q in 2013 Pakistani general election but was unsuccessful. He received 81,231 votes and lost the seat to Nawabzada Mazhar Ali.

In 2023, he appointed the as an president of PML-Q after his brother Chaudhry Shujaat Hussain was removed from the position by a breakway faction terminated the Chaudhry Shujaat Hussain's party membership for party rules violations.

References

Living people
Chaudhry family
Punjabi people
People from Gujrat District
Pakistan Muslim League (Q) politicians
1960 births
Pakistani MNAs 2002–2007
Pakistani MNAs 2008–2013